Child of the Ghetto is the debut album by rapper G. Dep. It was released on November 20, 2001 for Bad Boy Records and featured production from Sean Combs and members of The Hitmen, among others.

The album peaked at #106 on Billboard 200 and #23 on Top R&B/Hip-Hop Albums. Single "Special Delivery" from the album peaked at #59 on Hot R&B/Hip-Hop Songs and #3 on Hot Rap Singles. The sales of the album caused G. Dep to subsequently be dropped from Bad Boy Records.

Track listing

References 

2001 debut albums
Albums produced by Sean Combs
Bad Boy Records albums
G. Dep albums